Samantha Edwards may refer to:
 Samantha Edwards (athlete)
 Samantha Edwards (singer)

See also
 Sam Edwards (disambiguation)